Hugh Buchanan may refer to:
 Hugh Buchanan (politician)
 Hugh Buchanan (artist)